Lick Run is a  long 1st order tributary to the Youghiogheny River in Fayette County, Pennsylvania.

Course
Lick Run rises about 2 miles north of Bidwell, Pennsylvania, and then flows south to join the Youghiogheny River at Bidwell.

Watershed
Lick Run drains  of area, receives about 49.0 in/year of precipitation, has a wetness index of 305.60, and is about 91% forested.

See also
List of rivers of Pennsylvania

References

Tributaries of the Youghiogheny River
Rivers of Pennsylvania
Rivers of Fayette County, Pennsylvania